Botelloides ludbrookae is a species of sea snail, a marine gastropod mollusk in the family Trochidae, the top snails.

Subspecies
 Botelloides ludbrookae recens Ponder, 1985

Distribution
This marine species is endemic to Australia and occurs off Western Australia.

References

 Ponder, W.F. 1985. A revision of the genus Botelloides (Mollusca: Gastropoda: Trochacea). Department of Mines and Energy, South Australia, Special Publication 5: 301-327

External links
 To World Register of Marine Species

ludbrookae
Gastropods of Australia
Gastropods described in 1985